In geometry, the polyhedral group is any of the symmetry groups of the Platonic solids.

Groups
There are three polyhedral groups:
The tetrahedral group of order 12, rotational symmetry group of the regular tetrahedron. It is isomorphic to A4.
 The conjugacy classes of T are:
identity
4 × rotation by 120°, order 3, cw
4 × rotation by 120°, order 3, ccw
3 × rotation by 180°, order 2
The octahedral group of order 24, rotational symmetry group of the cube and the regular octahedron. It is isomorphic to S4.
The conjugacy classes of O are:
identity
6 × rotation by ±90° around vertices, order 4
8 × rotation by ±120° around triangle centers, order 3
3 × rotation by 180° around vertices, order 2
6 × rotation by 180° around midpoints of edges, order 2
The icosahedral group of order 60, rotational symmetry group of the regular dodecahedron and the regular icosahedron. It is isomorphic to A5.
The conjugacy classes of I are:
identity
12 × rotation by ±72°, order 5
12 × rotation by ±144°, order 5
20 × rotation by ±120°, order 3
15 × rotation by 180°, order 2

These symmetries double to 24, 48, 120 respectively for the full reflectional groups. The reflection symmetries have 6, 9, and 15 mirrors respectively. The octahedral symmetry, [4,3] can be seen as the union of 6 tetrahedral symmetry [3,3] mirrors, and 3 mirrors of dihedral symmetry Dih2, [2,2]. Pyritohedral symmetry is another doubling of tetrahedral symmetry.

The conjugacy classes of full tetrahedral symmetry, Td≅S4, are:
identity
8 × rotation by 120°
3 × rotation by 180°
6 × reflection in a plane through two rotation axes
6 × rotoreflection by 90°

The conjugacy classes of pyritohedral symmetry, Th, include those of T, with the two classes of 4 combined, and each with inversion:
identity
8 × rotation by 120°
3 × rotation by 180°
inversion
8 × rotoreflection by 60°
3 × reflection in a plane

The conjugacy classes of the full octahedral group, Oh≅S4 × C2, are:
inversion
6 × rotoreflection by 90°
8 × rotoreflection by 60°
3 × reflection in a plane perpendicular to a 4-fold axis
6 × reflection in a plane perpendicular to a 2-fold axis

The conjugacy classes of full icosahedral symmetry, Ih≅A5 × C2, include also each with inversion:
inversion
12 × rotoreflection by 108°, order 10
12 × rotoreflection by 36°, order 10
20 × rotoreflection by 60°, order 6
15 × reflection, order 2

Chiral polyhedral groups

Full polyhedral groups

See also 
 Wythoff symbol
 List of spherical symmetry groups

References 
 Coxeter, H. S. M. Regular Polytopes, 3rd ed. New York: Dover, 1973. (The Polyhedral Groups. §3.5, pp. 46–47)

External links 
 

Polyhedra